Dawn June Ratcliffe Brooker  (born 1959) is a British psychologist who is a professor at the University of Worcester and Director of the Association for Dementia Studies. In 2020 she was awarded an MBE for her services to dementia care.

Early life and education 
In 1984 Brooker graduated with a master's degree and qualified as a clinical psychologist at the University of Birmingham. She became interested in dementia because of her personal experiences, having grown up with a grandfather with dementia. After graduating, she worked as a psychologist, before returning to academia in the mid-nineties. She first heard Thomas Kitwood, a pioneer in dementia care who would eventually become her doctoral supervisor, speak at a conference in 1988. Her doctoral research focussed on improving the quality of care for people suffering from dementia.

Research and career 
Brooker was awarded a personal chair at the University of Bradford, where she continued Kitwood's work on person-centred dementia care. In 2009, Brooker founded the Association for Dementia Studies. She created  Care Fit for VIPS, an online resource that looks to assist care homes in delivering high quality dementia care.

Selected publications

Books

Articles

Awards and honours 
 2019 Universities UK Top 100 Lifesavers working in Higher Education
 2019 National Dementia Care Award Lifetime Achievement Award
 2020 Elected to the MBE in the Order of the British Empire

References 

1959 births
Living people
British psychologists
Alumni of the University of Birmingham
British women psychologists
Members of the Order of the British Empire
Academics of the University of Worcester